Dina Vakil (born 1946) is a journalist based in Mumbai, India. She became the first ever woman resident editor of The Times of India in 1993, working on the Bombay edition. After graduating from Mt Holyoke College, US in history in 1969, Vakil studied at the Columbia School of Journalism and graduated in 1970. Subsequently, she worked with the UNDP before returning to India.

References

Indian newspaper editors
Indian women newspaper editors
Indian women journalists
Living people
1946 births
Columbia University Graduate School of Journalism alumni
Journalists from Maharashtra
20th-century Indian journalists
The Times of India journalists
Women writers from Maharashtra
Writers from Mumbai
20th-century Indian women writers